Mato Miloš (born 30 June 1993) is a Croatian professional footballer who plays for Ekstraklasa side Widzew Łódź as a right-back.

Club career
Born in Pula, Miloš went through the ranks of his hometown club NK Jadran Poreč, before moving to NK Rijeka, aged 14. He got his first cap for Rijeka at the age of 17, during the 2010-11 Prva HNL. In early 2013, he was loaned to Cibalia, and this was followed by loans to Siena, Spezia and Perugia in Italy's Serie B. 

In August 2017, he was transferred to Benfica for a fee of €400,000. On 31 August, he joined Polish side Lechia Gdańsk on a season-long loan deal. In 2018, he moved to fellow Portuguese side CD Aves. In January 2021, he signed with Osijek.

On 27 August 2022, Miloš returned to Poland to join top division side Widzew Łódź on a two-year contract, with an option for another year.

International career
He has also had 3 caps for Croatia under-19 team, including a cap at the 2012 UEFA European Championship.

He made his senior debut for Croatia in a May 2017 friendly match against Mexico, coming on as a 90th-minute substitute for Nikola Vlašić. It remained his sole international appearance.

References

External links

1993 births
Living people
Sportspeople from Pula
Association football defenders
Croatian footballers
Croatia youth international footballers
Croatia under-21 international footballers
Croatia international footballers
HNK Rijeka players
HNK Cibalia players
A.C.N. Siena 1904 players
Spezia Calcio players
A.C. Perugia Calcio players
NK Istra 1961 players
S.L. Benfica footballers
Lechia Gdańsk players
C.D. Aves players
NK Osijek players
Widzew Łódź players
Croatian Football League players
Serie B players
Ekstraklasa players
Primeira Liga players
Croatian expatriate footballers
Expatriate footballers in Italy
Expatriate footballers in Portugal
Expatriate footballers in Poland
Croatian expatriate sportspeople in Italy
Croatian expatriate sportspeople in Portugal
Croatian expatriate sportspeople in Poland